The 2012 Copa Bionaire is a professional tennis tournament played on Clay courts. It is the sixth edition of the tournament which was part of the 2012 ITF Women's Circuit. The event took place in Cali, Colombia between 6 and 12 February 2012. It offered the prize of US$ 100,000.

WTA entrants

Seeds

 1 Rankings are as of January 30, 2012.

Other entrants
The following players received wildcards into the singles main draw:
  Catalina Castaño
  Karen Castiblanco
  Yuliana Lizarazo

The following players received entry from the qualifying draw:
  Annalisa Bona
  Inés Ferrer Suárez
  Alexandrina Naydenova
  Teliana Pereira

The following players received entry by a lucky loser spot:
  Ximena Hermoso

Champions

Singles

 Alexandra Dulgheru def.  Mandy Minella, 6–3, 1–6, 6–3

Doubles

 Karin Knapp /  Mandy Minella def.  Alexandra Cadanțu /  Raluca Olaru, 6–4, 6–3

References
 Official website
 ITF Website

Copa Bionaire
2012 in Colombian tennis
Copa Bionaire